Last Man Standing is an American sitcom created by Jack Burditt for ABC, later airing on Fox, that ran from October 11, 2011, to May 20, 2021. The show starred Tim Allen as an executive at a sporting goods store chain headquartered in Denver, Colorado, who is a married father of three daughters and a grandfather to his eldest daughter's son. Last Man Standing was a joint production by 21 Laps-Adelstein Productions, NestEgg Productions, and 20th Television.

The series originally ran on ABC from 2011 to 2017 for six seasons, and entered syndication in 2015. Despite being ABC's second-highest rated sitcom for the 2016–17 season, the network declined to renew Last Man Standing for a seventh season amid controversy, causing fans to petition for its renewal.  The following year, Fox announced it had picked up the show for a seventh season, which premiered on September 28, 2018.

In May 2020, Fox renewed the series for a ninth and final season, which premiered on January 3, 2021. The series concluded after 194 episodes on May 20, 2021. The series runs in syndication on CMT, NewsNation (formerly WGN America) and Up TV.

Premise
The series follows Mike Baxter, a senior executive and director of marketing for an outdoor sporting goods store chain based in Denver, Colorado. His home life is initially filled with his wife and three daughters (hence the "last man" in the show's title), along with a grandson. His life later extends to the young men who are married to or dating his daughters.

Cast and characters

Main
 Tim Allen as Michael Martin "Mike" Baxter: Mike is a father of three daughters and the director of marketing for the Outdoor Man chain of sporting goods stores. Mike staunchly supports traditional, conservative values.
 Nancy Travis as Vanessa Baxter (née Davidson), Mike's wife: Vanessa is a geologist working in the energy industry. In season four, Vanessa becomes frustrated with her job and decides to become a high-school science teacher. After being laid off as a teacher due to budget cuts, Vanessa begins her own tutoring business.
 Alexandra Krosney (season 1) and Amanda Fuller (seasons 2–9) as Kristin Beth Baxter Vogelson, the oldest daughter, initially a teenage mother trying to raise her son on her own.
 Molly Ephraim (seasons 1–6) and Molly McCook (seasons 7–9) as Amanda Elaine "Mandy" Baxter-Anderson, the learning-impaired, fashion-focused middle daughter.
 Kaitlyn Dever (regular, seasons 1–6; recurring, seasons 7–9) as Eve Baxter, the youngest daughter, a strong scholar and athlete with military aspirations, and allegedly Mike's favorite child.
 Christoph Sanders as Kyle Anderson, a young employee at Outdoor Man and later Mandy's husband.
 Héctor Elizondo as Edward "Ed" Alzate, Mike's longtime business partner, of Basque heritage, and later Vanessa's step-father.
 Flynn Morrison (regular, seasons 2–6), Jet Jurgensmeyer (regular, season 7; guest star, season 8) and Evan and Luke Kruntchev (recurring, season 1) as Boyd Baxter, son of Kristin and Ryan and grandson of Mike and Vanessa.
 Jordan Masterson (regular, seasons 4–9; recurring, seasons 2–3) and Nick Jonas (guest star, season 1) as Ryan Vogelson, Boyd's Canadian father who later re-enters his son's life and marries Kristin. He is very "left-wing" in his views, and thus clashes a lot with Mike.
 Jonathan Adams as Charles Marion "Chuck" Larabee (regular, seasons 4–9; recurring, seasons 2–3): Mike and Vanessa's neighbor, a retired U.S. Marine who later becomes the head of security at Outdoor Man.
 Krista Marie Yu as Jen (seasons 7–9), Vanessa's ethnocentric foreign-exchange student from Hong Kong who moves in with the Baxters in season 7.

Recurring
 Robert Forster as Bud Baxter (seasons 1, 3–4, 7), Mike's widower father. He died some time before season 7.
 Erika Alexander (seasons 2–5) and Tisha Campbell (season 7–9) as Carol Larabee, Chuck's wife and Mike and Vanessa's neighbor.
 Carla Jimenez as Blanca Alvarez (seasons 2–4), the Baxters' Guatemalan-born housekeeper who also helps Mandy with her fashion business.
 Sarah Gilman as Cammy Harris (seasons 2–6), Eve's soccer teammate and extremely chatty best friend.
 Jonathan Taylor Thomas as John Baker (seasons 2–3), Kristin's boss at a fancy restaurant where she works.
 Tye Sheridan as Justin (seasons 3–4), Eve's fellow Jr. ROTC member, football teammate and brief boyfriend.
 Zachary Gordon as Andrew (season 3), Eve's nerdy classmate.
 Joely Fisher as Wendi Gracin (seasons 3–5), Ed's obnoxious younger girlfriend, whom he meets near the end of season three.
 Bill Engvall as Reverend Paul (seasons 5–9), the new pastor of the Baxter family's church.
 Jay Leno as Joe Leonard (seasons 5–9), a semi-retired auto technician who later works in the repair shop at Outdoor Man.
 Travis Tope as Rob (season 6), Eve's boyfriend who is studying criminal justice at University of Colorado Boulder.
 Susan Sullivan as Bonnie Davidson (later Alzate) (seasons 7–9), Vanessa's mother who becomes Ed's wife.

Episodes

Production

Development and casting
Last Man Standing first appeared on ABC's development slate in late 2010 when writer Jack Burditt received a put pilot commitment from the network under the original title Man Up. In January 2011, ABC green-lighted production of a pilot episode under the title Last Days of Man. On February 18, Tim Allen, who had been attached to the potential series from the beginning, officially joined the project in the lead role. At the end of March, Nancy Travis joined the cast in the leading female role as Allen's "smart and loving wife who doesn't miss much". Soon thereafter, Héctor Elizondo came on board in a supporting role as the boss to Allen's character.

Shooting schedule
On May 13, 2011, ABC picked up the pilot for the 2011–2012 television season under the new title Last Man Standing. On May 17, 2011, ABC announced that the series would air on Tuesday nights at 8 Eastern/7 Central. It debuted on October 11, 2011, with the first two episodes airing in a one-hour premiere.

On November 3, 2011, the series was picked up for a full season of twenty-two episodes. On January 12, 2012, the order was increased to twenty-four episodes.

On May 11, 2012, ABC renewed the series for a second season set to air in the 2012–2013 season in November.

On June 11, 2012, Tim Doyle was hired as the new showrunner of the series. Doyle was the third showrunner that the series  had since it entered production. Doyle replaced Kevin Abbott, who joined the staff as the showrunner mid-way in the first season. Abbott replaced series creator Jack Burditt, who was the showrunner for the first thirteen episodes. Unlike Burditt, who is no longer credited as an executive producer, Abbott continued to serve as an executive producer while showrunning the fellow ABC sitcom Malibu Country starring Reba McEntire. Both Last Man Standing and Malibu Country aired as a part of ABC's Friday night lineup for the 2012–2013 primetime television season. On November 8, 2012, Abbott re-joined the Last Man Standing crew full-time, after a stint in rehab, and gave Nastaran Dibai full showrunning duties of Malibu Country.

On June 11, 2012, it was announced that Alexandra Krosney (Kristin) was let go from the show for creative reasons. Krosney was replaced by Amanda Fuller in season 2. On June 19, 2012, it was also announced that twins Luke and Evan Kruntchev, who played the role of Boyd in season 1, would not be returning; they were replaced by Flynn Morrison in season 2. The character of Boyd was also age-advanced from two years old to five years old. Jordan Masterson plays Ryan, Boyd's father, in a recurring role beginning in season 2. The role was previously played by Nick Jonas, who guest-starred in one episode in season 1.

The second season initially received a 13-episode order. ABC announced on November 12, 2012, that an additional three scripts had been ordered. On November 27, five more episodes were ordered to bring the second-season episode total to 18.

On May 10, 2013, the series was renewed for a third season, which premiered on September 20, 2013, and ended on April 25, 2014, after 22 episodes.

On May 10, 2014, ABC renewed Last Man Standing for a fourth season, which premiered on October 3, 2014. Allen and Elizondo guest-starred as their Last Man Standing characters in a crossover episode with the fellow ABC Friday sitcom Cristela.

On May 10, 2015, ABC announced the show had been renewed for a fifth season. Last Man Standing had become a solid performer for the Friday night lineup at ABC, which with the help of Shark Tank and 20/20 has become the top network among adults 18–49 for the night. Leading off Friday night for ABC, the sitcom averaged a 1.8 rating in adults 18–49 and 8.2 million viewers overall, according to Nielsen's Live+7 estimates.

On May 13, 2016, ABC renewed the series for a sixth season, which premiered on September 23, 2016.

On March 15, 2020, production on the series was shut down during the COVID-19 pandemic.

Cancellation
On May 10, 2017, ABC canceled Last Man Standing after six seasons, despite the series being the second-most-watched ABC sitcom during the 2016–17 season (based on Live+7 figures), with ratings remaining mostly steady during its sixth season. The cancellation caused the show's fans to question its motivation, and many took to social media to voice their displeasure and petition for another network to pick up the show. It also happened some months after lead actor Tim Allen (who is also a real-life Republican) said in an interview on Jimmy Kimmel Live!, that being a Republican in Hollywood is "like 1930s Germany. You gotta be real careful around here, you know. You'll get beat up if you don't believe what everybody believes". His comment was widely criticized, especially his comparing the treatment of Republicans in Hollywood with Nazi Germany.

A viewer petition on the website Change.org calling for ABC to reinstate Last Man Standing surpassed 380,000 signatures as of May 23, 2017. In a conference call with reporters earlier in May, ABC president Channing Dungey stated, "Last Man Standing was a challenging one for me, because it was a steady performer. Once we made the decision not to continue with comedy on Friday, it was just kind of that's where we landed." Dungey cited studio ownership, future creative direction, ratings and viewer engagement as all factors in her decision. A year later, the petition's signatures had grown to 438,000.

On May 16, 2017, Allen expressed his displeasure with the cancellation, writing: "Stunned and blindsided by the network I called home for the last six years."

On May 20, 2017, Howard Kurtzman, president of 20th Century Fox Television, reportedly showed some interest in his studio continuing to produce the show. "We're starting to explore that," Kurtzman said.  "... Jonnie and I are hopeful that we can find another home for it." Variety also confirmed in an exclusive report that 20th Century Fox Television would shop the series to other networks and streaming services in hopes it would be picked up for a seventh season; another home was not quickly found, however.

In August 2017, Allen expressed his appreciation for support by the show's fans to bring it back, and said the talent behind the show had much more to add.

Revival on Fox
On May 3, 2018, Allen wrote that a return "just might be a reality" and prompted the show's supporters to "keep it up". The same day, TVLine reported that Fox was "poised to" resurrect Last Man Standing for the 2018–19 TV season, adding that Tim Allen is "officially on board". Deadline Hollywood reported that Fox was in talks for another season, but it was "by no means a sure thing", suggesting it would depend on whether the actors could be re-signed "at reasonable salaries". On May 11, 2018, Fox TV's CEOs and chairmen announced that Fox had officially picked up Last Man Standing for a seventh season. Dana Walden, chairman of Fox Television Group, later hinted that the return of Last Man Standing was in part a response to the huge success of the Roseanne revival on ABC earlier in 2018: "Obviously, I think everyone took a good, hard look at the performance of Roseanne. It did so well, and it certainly did remind us that we have a huge, iconic comedy star in our Fox family in Tim Allen."

On July 2, Fox announced that, in addition to Allen, series regulars Nancy Travis, Amanda Fuller, Hector Elizondo, Christoph Sanders, Jordan Masterson and Jonathan Adams had all signed on to appear in the season 7 reboot. Molly Ephraim and Flynn Morrison both opted not to return for the new season, with Fox announcing their roles ("Mandy" and "Boyd", respectively) would be recast ahead of season 7. On August 6, 2018, it was announced that Molly McCook and Jet Jurgensmeyer would be taking over the roles of Mandy and Boyd, respectively. The article also stated that Kaitlyn Dever, who recently signed on to play a lead role in the 2019 Netflix miniseries Unbelievable, would return as Eve in a recurring role only.

For the seventh season, the show aired in the same Friday night time slot as for the last five of its six seasons on ABC; the show was renewed for an eighth season, and was moved to a new time slot, as Fox had signed an agreement to air WWE SmackDown on Friday nights beginning in fall 2019. When the Fox schedule was released in May 2019, Last Man Standing was placed in a Thursday night time slot, but only in weeks when Fox would not air NFL or XFL games. On October 24, 2019, it was announced that season eight had been scheduled to premiere on January 2, 2020, with 2 back-to-back episodes airing in an hour time slot for three weeks on January 2, 9 and 16, before returning to a one-episode-a-week time slot of 8/7c starting on January 23. On May 19, 2020, Fox renewed the series for a ninth and final season, which premiered on January 3, 2021.

Reception

Critical response

On review aggregation website Rotten Tomatoes, season one holds an approval rating of 14% based on 37 reviews, and the average rating is 4.14/10. The same site's critical consensus for the season reads, "Last Man Standing is a thoroughly  middling sitcom relying on jokes that feel alternately dated or hostile." On Metacritic, the season has a weighted average score of 33 out of 100, based on 24 critics, indicating "generally unfavorable reviews".

The Hollywood Reporter called the series "a predictable sitcom with a stupid premise and bad acting". Los Angeles Times: "The jokes and plots have been efficiently constructed, but most have no traction; they slide right off you, and the characters themselves seem disconnected from one another." Entertainment Weekly offered a slightly more favorable review of the show: "When I look at the now-rounded softness of Tim Allen, and note once again how his sandpaper voice contrasts winningly with his hopeful eyes, it's impossible to plunge a shiv into this series."

Season two of the series holds an approval rating of 40% on Rotten Tomatoes. Entertainment Weekly commented: "I think it's time the folks involved with Last take a closer look at All in the Family, in which the prejudice was built around real jokes." The A.V. Club'''s Emily VanDerWerff wrote: "The problem with Last Man Standings attempts to go political is exemplified by the first scene of the season première, which remains one of the most uncomfortable scenes of television I've ever watched... doing its best to push buttons in the audience that don't need to be pushed, as if it thinks what made [Norman] Lear's sitcoms a success was the yelling or the mentions of social issues that people sometimes argued about." Philly.com wrote about season three: "The unlikely comeback vehicle for Tim Allen, Last Man Standing on ABC, is a thoroughly traditional, absolutely charming sitcom. [...] Last Man is both economical and efficient, getting excellent comic mileage out of the most marginal bit players."

Season seven holds an approval rating of 58% based on 12 reviews and an average rating of 5.34/10. The website's critical consensus reads, "Last Man Standing isn't the most realistic sitcom on the dial, but its idealistic representation of opposites living in harmony offers sorely needed hope during divided times." On Metacritic, the season has a weighted average score of 58 out of 100, based on 6 critics, indicating "mixed or average reviews".

A study conducted during the 2016 U.S. presidential election found that it was the tenth most popular show on television with Republicans.

Ratings
ABC's series premiere of Last Man Standing drew a 3.5 adults 18–49 rating. That was 9% better than the 3.2 adults 18–49 rating for the series premiere of No Ordinary Family in the same time-slot the previous year (which was two weeks earlier in the season). Season 2 of Last Man Standing premiered with a 2.0, down about 38% from its first-season premiere, but up about 18% from the previous season's finale.  Ratings for the eighth season on Fox declined after the series moved to Thursday nights, competing with Young Sheldon (CBS) and Superstore (NBC). Despite the strong competition, Last Man Standing was still the highest-rated scripted comedy on Fox for the 2019–2020 season.

Awards and nominationsLast Man Standing was nominated for a 2012 People's Choice Award for "Favorite New TV Comedy", but lost to CBS's 2 Broke Girls.

Home media

Syndication
On September 3, 2015, it was announced that ABC Family (now Freeform) had obtained syndication rights to the series, which began airing episodes on September 28, 2015. As of 2018, Freeform no longer airs the series. On May 15, 2015, it was announced that Hallmark Channel had obtained the rights to the sitcom, and they aired the series from January 2016 until December 31, 2017. On September 6, 2015, the series joined the CMT Network with a mini-marathon of episodes. The series also joined WGN America (now NewsNation) on April 30, 2018, and USA Network on October 4, 2021. Since January 2020, all nine seasons are available for streaming on Hulu.

BroadcastLast Man Standing aired on ABC in the U.S.; on Fox8,
Network Ten, One and Eleven in Australia; City in Canada; and TV3 in New Zealand.

In the United Kingdom and Ireland, it premiered on October 9, 2012, on Sky One, which aired the first two seasons before dropping it due to low ratings; the show was bought by E4, where it premiered on March 13, 2017; Channel 4 then reran the program on Sunday mornings from July until September 2017; in 2018, 5Star and later Comedy Central UK respectively acquired the show for reruns and new episodes. Disney+, through its Star hub, acquired the show's ninth season as a Star Original.

In Israel, it airs on yes Comedy.

In Italy, it aired on FOX, RSI LA & FOX Comedy under the name L'uomo di casa (The Man of the House'') from 2012 until 2021.

In Flanders (Belgium), it airs on VTM.

In the Netherlands, it previously aired on RTL 7, but as of 2021 it airs on Comedy Central.

In Germany the show airs on ProSieben.

References

Notes

Citations

External links

 
 

2011 American television series debuts
2017 American television series endings
2018 American television series debuts
2021 American television series endings
2010s American sitcoms
2020s American sitcoms
American Broadcasting Company original programming
American television series revived after cancellation
Denver in fiction
English-language television shows
Fox Broadcasting Company original programming
Last Man Standing (American TV series)
Mass media portrayals of the working class
Teenage pregnancy in television
Television series about marriage
Television series about sisters
Television series by 20th Century Fox Television
Television shows set in Colorado